Currency Symbols is a Unicode block containing characters for representing unique monetary signs. Many currency signs can be found in other Unicode blocks, especially when the currency symbol is unique to a country that uses a script not generally used outside that country.

The display of Unicode currency symbols among various typefaces is inconsistent, more so than other characters in the repertoire. The French franc sign (U+20A3) is typically displayed as a struck-through F, but various versions of Garamond display it as an Fr ligature. The peseta sign (U+20A7), inherited from code page 437, is usually displayed as a Pts ligature, but Roboto displays it as a Pt ligature and Arial Unicode MS displays it as a partially struck-through P. The rupee sign (U+20A8) is usually displayed as an Rs digraph, but Microsoft Sans Serif uses the quantity-neutral "Rp" digraph instead.

Block

History
The following Unicode-related documents record the purpose and process of defining specific characters in the Currency Symbols block:

References 

Unicode blocks
Currency symbols